Caumbo is a town and municipality in Lunda Norte Province in Angola.

References

Populated places in Lunda Norte Province
Municipalities of Angola